Mabel Louise Robinson (July 19, 1874 – February 21, 1962) was an American writer of children's books. She was passionate about writing books for young adults.  Her "primary goal in life [was to] write books for young women, showcasing the protagonists worth, intelligence, and sensitivity".  Robinson reached her goal by “bring[ing] realistic and believable young adult problems to modern girl readers looking not only for excitement and fun but for honestly and reality as well.  Additionally,… [she] created vivid characters with whom girls could easily identify ”. Robinson was a runner-up for the annual Newbery Medal twice.

Early life and education 
Mabel Louise Robinson was born and raised in Waltham, Massachusetts. She was the daughter of James Frank and Mary Anna Dean Robinson. Robinson graduated high school and attended Radcliffe College from 1904 to 1906. While teaching at various colleges, Robinson worked on completing her master's degree (1907) and Ph.D (1915) at Columbia University in New York City.

Career
After graduating high school, Robinson became an elementary school teacher.
Robinson taught at a number of colleges and universities throughout her career.  At Wellesley College in Wellesley, Massachusetts, she taught Zoology from 1904 to 1906. For twenty-six years (1919 to 1945) she taught advanced fiction writing workshops at Columbia University in New York City.  Although she taught a variety of subjects, she is probably best known for her classes at Columbia University. While she was at Columbia, she taught a workshop that resulted in the publication of over two hundred books.  Robinson also taught at Constantinople College in Istanbul, Turkey.  She conducted research for the Carnegie Foundation in New York City.  Robinson was the author of children's books, frequently featuring dogs. Robinson contributed short stories to periodicals including Delineator, Portal, St. Nicholas Magazine, and The Youth's Companion.  Two of her books were designated Newbery Honor books by the American Library Association.  She felt that writing interesting books for young people was far more important than even obtaining her doctorate teacher.

Although Robinson wrote books for young readers and adults her passion laid in writing books for young female readers.  She also believed that her most important responsibility as an author was to teach others to write.  Robinson taught advanced writing classes for over twenty-five years at Columbia University and took great pride in her students accomplishments. Robinson “breathed life into a coastal area of Maine” and also had an interest in dogs and zoology.  She used these two different influences to develop “young female characters who ventured beyond their isolated childhoods into the wider world, often to return to their childhood home with a renewed appreciation”.  Books about dogs include Dr. Tam O’Shanter (1921), Stories that appeared in St. Nicholas Magazine, Robin and Tito (1931), Robin and Angus (1931), and Robin and Heather (1932).

Personal life
She taught creative writing at the Ivy League institution, Columbia University with her lifelong partner, Helen Rose Hull. Robinson died February 21, 1962.

Cultural impact
As a well-known author, Newbery runner-up and instructor of many successful authors, Robinson made an impact with both her work and her teaching.  Many of Robinson's books have been used in elementary schools. Grade school teachers use her stories to enhance their subjects. In a forum dedicated to education, one teacher recommends the book King Arthur and his Knights to other teachers as a good read for classes studying medieval times.  Being well known for her children's books and teachings in writing classes, Robinson's how-to books for writing are also very popular. This is especially denoted as Christian author Perry Thomas gives tips to young writers and says that “The best book on writing I've ever used is Writing for Young People by Mabel Louise Robinson”.  Her career in teaching has also led many of her students to produce successful books. She taught Walter Farley, author of The Black Stallion, a long series of well known children's books.  She also taught Ann Petry, author of The Street (1946), the first novel by an African-American woman to sell more than a million copies. She has also made an impact in the state of Maine. By basing many of her books there, Robinson has made herself well known in the area. When books about Maine are searched her children's novels such as Bright Island and Strong Winds show up.

Selected works

 Dr. Tom O’Shanter, Dutton (New York, NY), 1921
 Little Lucia, Dutton (New York, NY), 1922
 Juvenile Story Writing, Dutton (New York, NY), 1922
 Little Lucia and Her Puppy, Dutton (New York, NY), 1923
 Little Lucia’s Island Camp, Dutton (New York, NY), 1924
 Little Lucia’s School, illustrated by Sophia T. Balcom, Dutton (New York, NY), 1926
 (With Helen Rose Hull) Creative Writing: The Story Form, American Book Co. (New York, NY), 1932
 Bright Island, illustrated by Lynd Ward, Random House (New York, NY), 1937. — a Newbery Medal runner-up
 Runner of the Mountain Tops: The Life of Louis Agassiz, illustrated by Ward, Random House (New York, NY), 1939. — a Newbery runner-up
 Bitter Forfeit, Bobbs-Merrill (Indianapolis, IN), 1947
 Writing for Young People, Nelson (New York, NY), 1950
 Skipper Riley, the Terrier Sea Dog, illustrated by Shortall, Random House (New York, NY), 1955
 Riley Goes to Obedience School, illustrated by Shortall, Random House (New York, NY), 1956

References

External links 

 http://www.bookrags.com/biography/mabel-louise-robinson-dlb/
https://web.archive.org/web/20121022182442/http://www.unc.edu/~bflorenc/libraryladies/robinson.html
 Mabel Robinson at Library of Congress Authorities — with 33 catalog records
Finding aid to Mabel Louise Robinson papers at Columbia University. Rare Book & Manuscript Library.

 

1874 births
1962 deaths
20th-century American women writers
American children's writers
Columbia University alumni
Newbery Honor winners
Writers from Massachusetts
Radcliffe College alumni
Place of death missing
American women children's writers
People from Waltham, Massachusetts
American LGBT writers
LGBT people from Massachusetts